Cooch Behar College is an undergraduate college located in Cooch Behar, West Bengal. It was established in 1970 and offers bachelor's degree in Commerce (B.Com) and Arts (BA). The college is affiliated to Cooch Behar Panchanan Barma University. In 2016 the college has been awarded B++ grade by the National Assessment and Accreditation Council. The college is recognized by the University Grants Commission (UGC).

Courses offered 
B.A. Honours : Geography, Philosophy, History, Bengali, Economics, English, Political Science, Sanskrit
B.Com. Honours : Accountancy
B.Sc.Honours : Mathematics, Computer Science, Chemistry, Physics
BBA
COP: Eco Tourism and Management, Women Studies, Communicative English, Computer Applications
M.Sc: Geography
M.A: English
UGC-NSQF Course: Certificate & Diploma Course in Geoinformatics

See also

References

External links 
 Official Website

Universities and colleges in Cooch Behar district
Colleges affiliated to Cooch Behar Panchanan Barma University
Academic institutions formerly affiliated with the University of North Bengal
Educational institutions established in 1970
1970 establishments in West Bengal